Davit Bek (or David Bek) was an Armenian nobleman and revolutionary.

David Bek may also refer to:

 David Bek (novel), a novel by Armenian writer Raffi
 David Bek (opera), an opera composed by Armen Tigranian based on the novel
 David Bek (film), a 1944 Armenian film about David Bek
 Davit Bek, Armenia, a town in Syunik Province of Armenia